Asiapistosia stigma is a moth of the subfamily Arctiinae first described by Cheng-Lai Fang in 2000. It is found in the Chinese provinces of Sichuan, Shaanxi, Hubei and Guangdong.

References

External links
 , 2000: Fauna Sinica. Insecta. 19. Lepidoptera. Arctiidae. Beijing: Science Press, 590 p., 20 pl. (In Chinese).

Moths described in 2000
Lithosiina
Moths of Asia